War Zone: Music for Obnoxious Yuppie Scum is the twelfth studio album by experimental rock composer Zoogz Rift, released on March 31, 1990 by Musical Tragedies.

Track listing

Personnel 
Adapted from the War Zone: Music for Obnoxious Yuppie Scum liner notes.
 Zoogz Rift – lead vocals, guitar, production, cover art, design

Musicians
 Roch Bordenave – trombone
 Tom Brown – drums, percussion, additional vocals
 Willie Lapin – bass guitar, additional vocals
 Marc Mylar – tenor saxophone
 Jonathan "Mako" Sharkey – keyboards, additional vocals
Production and additional personnel
 Arthur Barrow – engineering

Release history

References

External links 
 War Zone (Music for Obnoxious Yuppie Scum) at iTunes
 War Zone (Music for Obnoxious Yuppie Scum) at Discogs (list of releases)

1990 albums
Zoogz Rift albums